Eremochelis is a genus of Eremobatid camel spiders, first described by Carl Friedrich Roewer in 1934.

Species
, the World Solifugae Catalog accepts the following thirty-nine species:

 Eremochelis acrilobatus (Muma, 1962) — US (California)
 Eremochelis albaventralis Brookhart and Cushing, 2005 — Mexico, US (California)
 Eremochelis andreasana (Muma, 1962) — Mexico
 Eremochelis arcus (Muma, 1962) — US (California, Nevada)
 Eremochelis bechteli Muma, 1989 — US (Nevada)
 Eremochelis bidepressus (Muma, 1951) — US (Idaho, Nevada)
 Eremochelis bilobatus (Muma, 1951) — Mexico, US (Arizona, California, Colorado, New Mexico, Texas)
 Eremochelis branchi (Muma, 1951) — US (Arizona, California, Nevada)
 Eremochelis cochiseae Muma, 1989 — US (Arizona)
 Eremochelis coloradensis (Muma, 1962) — US (Arizona)
 Eremochelis cuyamacanus (Muma, 1962) — US (California)
 Eremochelis flavus Muma, 1989 — US (California)
 Eremochelis flexacus (Muma, 1963) — Mexico, US (Nevada)
 Eremochelis fuscellus Muma, 1989 — US (Arizona, California)
 Eremochelis gertschi (Muma, 1951) — US (Utah)
 Eremochelis giboi Muma, 1989 — US (California)
 Eremochelis imperialis (Muma, 1951) — Mexico, US (Arizona, California, Nevada)
 Eremochelis insignatus Roewer, 1934 — US (Arizona, California, Colorado, Nevada)
 Eremochelis iviei (Muma, 1951) — US (Arizona)
 Eremochelis kastoni Rowland, 1974 — US (California)
 Eremochelis kerni Muma, 1989 — US (California)
 Eremochelis lagunensis Vázquez, 1991 — Mexico
 Eremochelis larreae (Muma, 1962) — US (California)
 Eremochelis macswaini (Muma, 1962) — US (California)
 Eremochelis malkini (Muma, 1951) — US (Arizona, California, Utah)
 Eremochelis medialis (Muma, 1951) — US (California)
 Eremochelis morrisi (Muma, 1951) — US (California)
 Eremochelis noonani Muma, 1989 — US (California)
 Eremochelis nudus (Muma, 1963) — US (Nevada)
 Eremochelis oregonensis Brookhart & Cushing, 2005 — US (Oregon)
 Eremochelis plicatus (Muma, 1962) — US (Nevada)
 Eremochelis rossi Muma, 1986 — Mexico
 Eremochelis rothi (Muma, 1962) — US (Arizona)
 Eremochelis saltoni Muma, 1989 — US (California)
 Eremochelis sonorae Muma, 1986 — Mexico
 Eremochelis striodorsalis (Muma, 1962) — US (California)
 Eremochelis tanneri Muma, 1989 — US (Utah)
 Eremochelis truncus Muma, 1986 — Mexico
 Eremochelis undulus Roewer, 1934 — US (Colorado)

References

Solifugae